Sidy Mamadou Aubin Diagne (born 11 January 2002) is a professional footballer who plays as a defender for Angers SCO. Born in France, he represents Switzerland as a youth international.

Club career
Diagne is a product of the youth academies of Sous-Roches Valentigney and Sochaux. He began his senior career with the reserves of Sochaux in 2019. He made his professional debut with Sochaux in a 2–0 Ligue 2 win over Paris FC on 18 September 2021.

International career
Born  in France, Diagne is of Senegalese and Swiss descent. Diagne was called up for a training camp with the France U16s in August 2017. He represented the Switzerland U18s in 2019.

References

External links
 
 SFV U18 Profile

2002 births
Living people
Sportspeople from Montbéliard
Footballers from Bourgogne-Franche-Comté
Swiss men's footballers
Switzerland youth international footballers
French footballers
Swiss people of Senegalese descent
French people of Swiss descent
French sportspeople of Senegalese descent
Association football defenders
FC Sochaux-Montbéliard players
Ligue 2 players
Championnat National 3 players
Championnat National 2 players